Marcos Antônio or António is a Brazilian given name which may refer to::

Marcos Antônio (footballer, born 1979), Brazilian football striker
Marcos António (footballer, born 1983), Brazilian football defender
Marcos Antônio (footballer, born 1988), Brazilian football midfielder
Marcos Antônio (footballer, born 2000), Brazilian football midfielder

See also
Marco Antonio (disambiguation)